The Port of Dili is a seaport in Dili, East Timor. Prior to 30 September 2022, it was the main and only international port of entry to East Timor. On that day, its container operations were transferred to the Tibar Bay Port. Since then, the Port of Dili's facilities have been open only to domestic passenger ships and cruise ships carrying international tourists.

Geography
It is on the north side of central Dili, and at the southern extremity of the Bay of Dili, facing Ombai Strait. The site is suitable for a port because a natural reef along its perimeter provides protection from severe weather. Protection of this kind is crucial for seaports in Southeast Asia, where there is an annual monsoon season.

The approach to the port is a narrow passage through two reefs marked by beacons. Night entry is not recommended, as there are reefs and unmarked wrecks inside the bay. During monsoon season, between November and the end of March, ships in port are slightly exposed to north-westerly winds.

History

Portuguese colonial era
Dili has had a port since at least as far back as 1769. That year, the governor of Portuguese Timor sought to break the influence of powerful local families in Lifau, Oecusse, his then residence, by moving the colonial administration and 1,200 people to the site of what would become Dili.

Until well into the twentieth century, the port facilities at Dili were minimal. Prior to 1964, when the first substantial wharf was completed, vessels calling at the port had to rely upon barges for loading and unloading.

On the evening of 26/27 August 1975, the Portuguese colonial administration was evacuated from Dili via the port to the offshore island of Atauro.

On 7 December 1975, Indonesian troops landed in Dili. After capturing the city, the Indonesians led Chinese residents, members of Fretilin and other prisoners to the port area, shot them, and threw their bodies into the sea. Eyewitnesses later reported that there were dozens of bodies. The victims included suffragette Rosa Bonaparte, her brother , Isabel Barreto Lobato (wife of Fretilin-appointed Prime Minister Nicolau dos Reis Lobato) and Roger East, the last remaining foreign reporter in Dili. The total number of people executed on the Dili waterfront is estimated at 150.

1975–1999
From 1984, it was managed by a state-owned enterprise; with its large capital costs and limited turnover, it was difficult to operate profitably. Korean, Japanese and Singaporean cargo ships docked at the port regularly, except towards the end of the occupation; only one Singaporean ship arrived in 1998, and no international ships at all berthed there in the first half of 1999.

Other cargo handling facilities and equipment were minimal, and there was a shortage of tugboats.

A particular difficulty for cargo operations at the port was that passenger ships had priority, a practice that reduced cargo volumes, added substantially to unloading times, and increased costs. The port was described as one of the worst in the region; goods could often be trucked into the then province of East Timor by distributors in Kupang, West Timor, at a lower cost. Regular Perintis passenger services were operated twice each month to Surabaya and Ujung Pandang, and less frequently to Jakarta, Irian Jaya, and Banyuwangi in East Java. Between January and May 1999, 16,738 passengers disembarked in Dili, and 20,705 embarked there.

1999–present
In the aftermath of the referendum on East Timorese independence held on 30 August 1999, systematic violence by paramilitary groups broke out in Dili and elsewhere in East Timor. Under international pressure, the President of Indonesia, B. J. Habibie, announced on 12 September 1999 that Indonesia would withdraw its soldiers from the territory, and allow an Australian-led international peacekeeping force, INTERFET, to enter. INTERFET arranged for 91.7 per cent of its cargo by weight and 93.2 per cent by volume, and most of its passengers, to arrive in East Timor by sea, mainly at the port of Dili.

Shortly after the independence referendum, the Central Maritime Hotel was towed to Dili and moored close to the port's wharf. A former Russian hospital ship that had been converted into a floating luxury hotel, it remained in Dili for several years. Prior to its arrival, Dili had no landbound hotels or restaurants suitable for international visitors.

Of the goods processed, 80% were imports.

As of the 2010s, the Port of Dili was the main and only international port of entry to East Timor. By the middle of that decade, the port, although improved by Japanese  grant aid, had a nearly saturated capacity, and its safety measures were not satisfactory.
It was struggling to cope with its volume of cargo and could not be expanded due to the physical constraints of its location. The depth alongside the wharf was such that only small container ships could berth alongside, and the berths and approach channel required frequent dredging. Larger ships were forced to unload onto lighters, causing delays and  added costs. Further, the apron and container stacking areas were in poor condition due to lack of maintenance.

Shipments to and from the port were restricted to containerised and conventional cargos. The port had no facilities to handle bulk cargos, and any fuel or liquids coming into it had to be shipped in ISO containers. Two privately owned fuel jetties close to Dili were used for bulk fuel shipments. Theoretically, the port had the capacity to import and export 120,000 TEU/Year, but the container yard was not able to function as efficiently as average container ports. The records taken in 2014 had 51,822 TEU passing in or out.

The port also experienced delays of up to 10 days for commercial container ships. The main onshore method for loading and unloading cargo was mobile cranes operated by private companies.

Storage facilities within the port were very limited. However, the port warehouses, located within a secure area, were permanent structures with good drainage and corrugated iron roofing. On the port's hard standing, a maximum of only 1,000 containers could be stored. Some of the stevedoring companies operating in the port had storage compounds outside the port. As of January 2014, land was being levelled in Tasitolu,  to the west of the port, to create additional storage.

To solve the problems of congestion, the government planned, as of 2014, to:

 Improve the management of cargo ships by utilizing the quayside, as loading and unloading cargo ships takes more time than passenger vessels. 
 Increase the space of the shipping-container yard to allow for an increase of storage space for containers.
 Implement night-time operation for both the general cargo and container areas.
 Coordinate general cargo and passenger loading and unloading. 
 Establish the west end as the ferry and passenger area, and the east side to general cargo and container operations.
 Improve security by constructing fencing, CCTV camera systems, security lighting, clocking systems and passenger scanners.

Replacement container port

The 30-year Tibar Bay Port concession contract was the first public-private partnership ever undertaken in East Timor. The greenfield project was intended to replace the existing port of Dili with a modern container port that would be able to handle up to 350,000 TEU annually. The new port was planned to consist of a  wharf with a  draft, and a  container yard.

Subsequently, Bolloré Group contracted with China Harbour Engineering Company to construct the new port.

Construction was declared to be underway in June 2017 and August 2018, and was originally scheduled to be completed by the end of 2020. However, issues with funding and subcontracting delayed progress, and the official ceremony launching the project was not held until 15 July 2019. 

On 30 September 2022, Tibar Bay Port came into operation, and the facilities at the Port of Dili were closed to container ships. Since then, the facilities have been open only to domestic passenger ships and cruise ships carrying international tourists.

Facilities
The Port of Dili is relatively small. There are two roll-on/roll-off ramps – one at the east end of the wharf and the other at the west end – and a yacht anchorage on the port side of the wharf.

Operations
Entrance to the port for vessels is restricted to 7:30 a.m. to 5:30 p.m. The wharves and port gates are operational 24 hours a day.

Concerns
Concerns have been raised by the government about the port's capacity and maintenance. As of 2014, maintenance, management manuals, and routine port checks were nonexistent, and staff size, experience and budget were not sufficient, and accident records were not available. The government pushed the port to establish a record of incidents.

Government officials, especially former prime minister Dr. Mari Alkatiri, were concerned with how sea level rise (SLR) will affect the port. Another concern is that SLR causes flooding to a great portion of the island. Studies were attempting to establish effects on the port, but information and data are lacking.

See also
 Transport in East Timor
 Tibar Bay Port

References

External links 

Dili